The Newark Advertiser is a British regional newspaper, owned by Iliffe Media, for the town of Newark-on-Trent and surrounding areas.

History 

The Advertiser had its beginnings in 1847, when printer William Tomlinson of Stodman Street issued the first Newark Monthly Advertiser. It had four pages and cost 1d. In 1854 Tomlinson made his journal a weekly publication, called it the Newark Advertiser and Farmers' Journal, doubled its size to eight pages and trebled the price to 3d. Upon Tomlinson's death his son-in-law Mr Whiles became the sole owner of the Advertiser.

In 1874 Cornelius Brown became editor of the Newark Advertiser. Within months of taking the editor's chair, Brown was ready to buy a half-share in the newspaper, for which he paid Mr Whiles £600. The Newark Advertiser Co Ltd was incorporated on 19 September 1882.

When Whiles died in 1900, he was succeeded by his son Herbert Whiles. In 1903 J. C. Kew came on to the Advertiser scene in a significant way. He had already been writing for the paper for some years and also ran a coal business at Beaumond Cross. Brown at the age of 51 decided to hand over some of his editorial responsibilities to Kew who was then 35.

Cornelius Brown died on 4 November 1907 and Kew became editor.

See also
S. S. Chamberlain (1851–1916), who started his newspaper career as a journalist on the paper (1873–1874)

External links 
 Newark Advertiser

Newspapers published in Nottinghamshire
Newark-on-Trent
Publications established in 1854
1854 establishments in England